Municipal Auditorium may refer to:

Places in the United States

 Alabama
Mobile Civic Center, previously known as the Municipal Auditorium
Boutwell Memorial Auditorium, previously known as the Municipal Auditorium, in Birmingham

 Arkansas
Crossett Municipal Auditorium

 California
Riverside Municipal Auditorium

 Colorado
Denver Municipal Auditorium

 Florida
Municipal Auditorium-Recreation Club in Sarasota

 Georgia
Albany Municipal Auditorium
Municipal Auditorium (Atlanta)
Municipal Auditorium (Columbus, Georgia)
Municipal Auditorium (Macon, Georgia)

 Iowa
Sioux City Municipal Auditorium

 Louisiana
Municipal Auditorium (New Orleans)
Municipal Auditorium (Shreveport)

 Missouri
Municipal Auditorium (Kansas City, Missouri)

 Nebraska
Beatrice Municipal Auditorium, listed on the National Register of Historic Places (NRHP) in Gage County, Nebraska
Fremont Municipal Auditorium, listed on the NRHP in Dodge County, Nebraska
Wayne Municipal Auditorium, listed on the NRHP in Nebraska

 New Mexico
Mountainair Municipal Auditorium, listed on the NRHP in New Mexico

 North Carolina
Clayton Graded School and Clayton Grammar School-Municipal Auditorium

 North Dakota
Minot Municipal Auditorium
Valley City Municipal Auditorium

 Oklahoma
Ardmore Municipal Auditorium listed on the NRHP in Carter County, Oklahoma
Civic Center Music Hall in Oklahoma City, formerly known as the Municipal Auditorium

 Oregon
Keller Auditorium, formerly known as the Portland Municipal Auditorium, in Portland

 Pennsylvania
Municipal Auditorium (Philadelphia), now known as Philadelphia Convention Hall and Civic Center 

 Tennessee
Nashville Municipal Auditorium

 Texas
San Antonio Municipal Auditorium

 West Virginia

Charleston Municipal Auditorium